The Asx motif is a commonly occurring feature in proteins and polypeptides.  It consists of four or five amino acid residues with either aspartate or asparagine as the first residue (residue i). It is defined by two internal hydrogen bonds. One is between the side chain oxygen  of residue i and the main chain NH of residue i+2 or i+3; the other is between the main chain oxygen of residue i and the main chain NH of residue i+3 or i+4.  Asx motifs occur commonly in proteins and polypeptides.

   
When one of the hydrogen bonds is between the main chain oxygen of residue i and the side chain NH of residue i+3 the motif incorporates a beta turn. When one of the hydrogen bonds is between the side chain oxygen of residue i and the main chain NH of residue i+2 the motif incorporates an Asx turn.

As with Asx turns, a significant proportion of Asx motifs occur at the N-terminus of an alpha helix with the Asx as the N cap residue. Asx motifs have thus often been described as helix capping features.

A related motif is the ST motif which has serine or threonine as the first residue.

References

External links 
 Motivated Proteins:  
 PDBeMotif .

Protein structural motifs